"In the House of Stone and Light" is the debut single by British musician Martin Page, released in July 1994 from his debut album of the same name. The song peaked at number 14 on the U.S. Billboard Hot 100 chart in 1995 and reached number one on the Billboard Adult Contemporary chart.

The mountain in the intro of the song is Mount Kailas, located near the land of Shambhala. The present Mount Kailash in Tibet is linked with the history of the Ramayana.

Page also refers to the Havasupai name of the Grand Canyon, "the house of stone and light", in the lyrics and the title; the Grand Canyon is where the Havasupai tribe considers its tribal land to be and is sacred to the tribe.

Charts

Weekly charts

Year-end charts

References

1994 songs
1994 debut singles
1995 singles
Martin Page songs
Songs written by Martin Page
Mercury Records singles